Mehdi Torabi (born 10 September 1994) is an Iranian professional footballer who plays as a winger for Persian Gulf Pro League club Persepolis and Iran national team.

Club career

Saipa

He started his career with Saipa from youth levels. He was promoted to the first team by Mojtaba Taghavi in summer 2012. He made his Persian Gulf Cup debut for Saipa in the 2013–14 season against Mes Kerman as a substitute. His subsequent performances were deemed worthy of a Team Melli call up.

Persepolis
On 1 July 2018, Torabi signed a three-year deal with Persepolis. He was sent on back on loan to Saipa for the first half of the season until Persepolis had served their transfer ban. On 16 December 2018, Torabi officially joined Persepolis' squad and was assigned the number 9.

Torabi scored his first goal for Persepolis in a 3–2 victory over Saipa on 13 April 2019.

International career

Youth level
He was invited to Iran U23 preliminary camp by Nelo Vingada. He was included in the squad for the 2016 AFC U-23 Championship by coach Mohammad Khakpour and he scored his first goal of the tournament in the last group match against China from a 30-yard free kick.

Senior level
He made his debut against Uzbekistan on a friendly on 11 June 2015 where he scored the lone goal of the match. On 3 September 2015 Torabi came off the bench to score in a 6–0 victory against Guam. In May 2018 he was named in Iran's preliminary squad for the 2018 FIFA World Cup in Russia.

Personal life

Political views
Torabi has been known to be a supporter of the government of the Islamic Republic of Iran, having worn a shirt in support of Iran's Supreme Leader Ali Khamenei and wanting to offer him a football as a gift during the Mahsa Amini protests. In 2019, Torabi lifted his shirt up with a message of support to the government during the 2019–2020 Iranian protests as well.

Career statistics

Club

International
Statistics accurate as of match played 29 November 2022.

International goals
As of match played 10 November 2022. Iran score listed first, score column indicates score after each Torabi goal.

Honours

Club 
Persepolis
Persian Gulf Pro League (3): 2018–19, 2019–20, 2020–21
Hazfi Cup (1): 2018–19
Iranian Super Cup (2): 2019, 2020 ; Runner-up (1): 2021

Individual 

Iranian Young Player of the Year: 2016
Persian Gulf Pro League Team of the Year: 2015–16
Navad Player of the Month: April 2018, May 2018

References

External links
Mehdi Torabi at PersianLeague.com
Mehdi Torabi at IranLeague.ir
Mehdi Torabi at metrica.ir

1994 births
Living people
Iranian footballers
Iranian expatriate footballers
Saipa F.C. players
Persepolis F.C. players
Al-Arabi SC (Qatar) players
Persian Gulf Pro League players
Qatar Stars League players
People from Karaj
Iran international footballers
Association football wingers
2018 FIFA World Cup players
2019 AFC Asian Cup players
Expatriate footballers in Qatar
Iranian expatriate sportspeople in Qatar
2022 FIFA World Cup players